Kevin McCurley may refer to:

 Kevin McCurley (cryptographer), American mathematician, computer scientist and cryptographer
 Kevin McCurley (footballer) (1926–2000), English football forward